The Invisible Informer is a 1946 action film starring Linda Stirling, William Henry, and Adele Mara. Produced by Republic Pictures, it was directed by Philip Ford and written by Gerald Adams and Sherman Lowe.

Plot
Insurance investigators Eve Rogers and Mike Reagan are assigned to a Louisiana case involving a stolen emerald necklace, following a private detective's death. Disagreeing over how to work the case, Eve and Mike decide to do so separately, not revealing their true identities to their suspects, the Baylor family.

Rosalind Baylor confides that she and her mother despise brother Eric and relate how another brother, David, committed suicide. Eric takes a romantic interest in Eve, which becomes mutual, even though he is under suspicion. Mike, meantime, teams with Marie Revelle, a woman he meets, unaware that she is secretly Eric's lover.

David turns out to be still alive. But when he presses his brother Eric for his cut of the insurance loot, Eric kills him. Eric also murders Marie and has the same thing in mind for Eve after discovering who she really is, but a violent fistfight with Mike results in Eric's death and recovery of the necklace. Mike and Eve, relieved to be alive, realize they are in love with one another.

Cast
 Linda Stirling as Eve Rogers
 William Henry as Mike Reagan
 Adele Mara as Marie Revelle
 Peggy Stewart as Rosalind Baylor
 Gerald Mohr as Eric Baylor
 Claire DuBrey as Martha

References

External links
 
 
 

1946 films
1940s action films
1946 short films
American short films
American action films
American black-and-white films
Films set in Louisiana
1940s American films